Stephanie de Montalk (born 1945) is a poet and biographer from New Zealand.

Background 
Born in 1945, in New Zealand, de Montalk grew up in the Far North and Wellington. She trained at Wellington Hospital School of Nursing and received and MA and PhD in Creative Writing from Victoria University of Wellington. She has worked as a nurse, documentary filmmaker, and from 1996–2002 member of the New Zealand Film and Literature Board of Review.

Works 
Published works by de Montalk include:
 Five Poems (1989, chapbook), poetry
 Animals Indoors (2000, Victoria University Press), poetry
 The Scientific Evidence of Dr Wang (2002, Victoria University Press), poetry
 Cover Stories (2005, Victoria University Press), poetry
 The Fountain of Tears (2006, Victoria University Press), historical novel
 Vivid Familiar (2009, Victoria University Press), poetry
de Montalk has also published in various literary journals including Landfall, Southerly, London Magazine, and New Zealand Listener. Her poems have also been published in the 2005 the Best New Zealand Poems series.

In 2001, she published a biography of her second-cousin Geoffrey Potocki de Montalk entitled, Unquiet World: The Life of Count Geoffrey Potocki de Montalk.

Following an accident in 2003, de Montalk's writing has often explored concepts of isolation and exile. In her 2014 creative nonfiction work, How Does It Hurt? she explores ideas around chronic pain, both her own and the experiences of other writers.

In 2007, an engraving of her poem, Violinist at the Edge of an Ice Field was erected at the Franz Josef Glacier visitor centre.

Awards 
In 1997, while studying at the Victoria University of Wellington de Montalk was a joint winner of the Original Composition prize. Also in 1997, her short story 'The Waiting' was a joint winner of the Novice Writers' Award in the Bank of New Zealand Katherine Mansfield Short Story Awards.

In 2001 her collection Animals Indoors won the NZSA Jessie Mackay Best First Book for Poetry at the Montana New Zealand Book Awards.

In 2006 she was the Victoria University of Wellington Writer in Residence.

How Does It Hurt? won the Nigel Cox Award from Unity Books in 2015.

References

External links 
Official website

Living people
1945 births
New Zealand women poets
People from the Wellington Region
International Institute of Modern Letters alumni
Place of birth missing (living people)